Dolomedes briangreenei is a species of fishing spiders found in Australia. The species name honours the physicist Brian Greene.

References

briangreenei
Spiders of Australia
Spiders described in 2018